Morophaga choragella is a moth of the family Tineidae. It is found in Europe.

Description
The wingspan is 18–32 mm. It is a brown-speckled moths. The antennae are wire-shaped and a little over half as long as the forewings. The head is covered with short, grey-brown, hair-like scales. The thorax is brown with lighter sides. The forewings are rounded, the base color is yellow-brown with darker markings, also some small, white spots. In the middle of the wing there is a comma-shaped, darker spot from the back edge, this is edged with white. The forewing has fringes of dark grey-brown with a narrow, light middle stripe and four narrow, white fields. The hind wing is grey, with short hair fringes that are light grey with a darker band in the middle. The larva is dirty yellowish white with a dark brown head.

Biology
The moth flies from May to September.

The larvae feed on mushrooms, particularly Piptoporus betulinus and Ganoderma applanatum, and dead wood.

References
Content in this edit is translated from the existing Norwegian Wikipedia article at :no:Morophaga choragella; see its history for attribution.

External links
 waarneming.nl 
 Lepidoptera of Belgium
 Morophaga choragella on UKmoths

Tineidae
Moths of Japan
Moths of Europe
Moths of Asia
Moths described in 1775